My Home's in Alabama is the fourth studio album by American country music band Alabama, released in May 1980 on RCA Nashville, their breakthrough album. It peaked at No. 3 on the Country album charts and no. 71 on Billboard 200.

The title track pays homage to Alabama's southern rock roots. It reached No. 17 on the Billboard Hot Country Singles chart in early 1980. Two other tracks — the fiddle-heavy, southern rock-influenced "Tennessee River" and the ballad "Why Lady Why" — were the band's first two No. 1 songs, and laid the foundation for what became one of the most impressive popularity runs in country music history.

Also included on My Home's In Alabama is the band's 1979  single, "I Wanna Come Over", which peaked at No. 33 in November 1979. Both that song and the better-known title track were originally issued by MDJ Records, before the band was signed to RCA in early 1980. The album eventually became the group's first major-label debut studio album to be distributed by RCA Records in Nashville. After this major-label debut studio album was released, Alabama would go on to record more new studio albums and what not at the RCA Records label for the rest of their career.

Track listing

Personnel

Alabama
Randy Owen - lead vocals and rhythm guitar
Teddy Gentry - bass guitar and vocals
Jeff Cook - lead guitar, keyboards, fiddle and vocals, lead vocals on "Some Other Place, Some Other Time" and "Keep On Dreamin'"
Mark Herndon - drums (Track 2)

Other musicians
CREDITED:
Jack Eubanks - acoustic guitar (Tracks 4, 6)
Sonny Garrish - steel guitar (Tracks 5, 6, 7)
David Humphreys - drums (Tracks 4)
Leo Jackson - acoustic guitar (Tracks 4, 6)
Terry McMillan - harmonica (Track 1)
Fred Newell - guitar (Tracks 4, 6)
Willie Rainsford - keyboards (Tracks 1, 4, 6)
Billy Reynolds - guitar (Tracks 4, 6)
David Smith - bass guitar (Tracks 4, 6)
Strings arranged by Kristin Wilkinson and performed by "The Wire Choir".
UnCredited:
Rick Scott - drums (Tracks 1, 3, 5, 6, 7, 8, 9, 10)
Arliss Scott - rhythm guitar (Tracks 1, 3, 5, 6, 7, 8, 9, 10), gut-string lead guitar (Track 7)
Hargus "Pig" Robbins - piano (Track 7)
Strings (Track 5) arranged by Wayne Mosley

Production:  Harold Shedd, Larry McBride & Alabama.  Tracks 5 & 8 produced by Sonny Limbo (Associate producer, Shelton Irwin).

Charts

Weekly charts

Year-end charts

Certifications

References

1980 albums
RCA Records albums
Alabama (American band) albums
Albums produced by Harold Shedd